Richard Mark Ranby (born 1 June 1977) is a former New Zealand rugby union player. A midfield back, Ranby represented Manawatu, the Central Vikings and Waikato at a provincial level, and the Hurricanes and the Chiefs in Super Rugby. He played one international for the New Zealand national side, the All Blacks, against Samoa in 2001. He played for the Japanese side Coca-Cola West Red Sparks for two seasons from 2006. He spent a year studying at the University of Cambridge in 2008–09, completing a Diploma in Theology and Religious Studies, and played for Cambridge against Oxford in the 2008 Varsity Match. In 2012 he was appointed professional development manager for the Crusaders and Canterbury Rugby.

Ranby's mother, Margaret Kouvelis, was elected Mayor of Manawatu in 2012.

References

1977 births
Living people
People from Putāruru
People educated at Freyberg High School
Massey University alumni
Manawatu rugby union players
Waikato rugby union players
Hurricanes (rugby union) players
Chiefs (rugby union) players
Coca-Cola Red Sparks players
New Zealand rugby union players
New Zealand international rugby union players
Expatriate rugby union players in Japan
New Zealand expatriate sportspeople in Japan
Alumni of St Edmund's College, Cambridge
Cambridge University R.U.F.C. players
Rugby union players from Waikato